Moi or MOI may refer to:

People
 Moi (name), a list of people with the given name or surname
 Moisés Delgado (born 1994), Spanish footballer commonly known as simply Moi
 Moisés Rodríguez (born 1997), Spanish footballer commonly known as simply Moi

Places

Kenya
 Moi Air Base, a military airport east of Nairobi, Kenya
 Moi International Airport, Mombasa, Kenya
 Moi International Sports Centre, a multi-purpose stadium in Kasarani, Kenya
 Moi Stadium, a multi-purpose facility in Kisumu, Kenya
 Moi University, a public university in Eldoret, western Kenya

Norway
 Moi, Norway, the administrative centre of Lund municipality
 Moi, Agder, a small village

Other places
 Moi, a village in Bâlteni Commune, Gorj County, Romania
 McLeod Glacier (South Orkney Islands)
 Moi Center, a complex of buildings in Shenyang, China

Acronyms

Arts and entertainment
 The Mothers of Invention, a 1960s band led by Frank Zappa
 Master of Illusion (video game), a 2007 Nintendo DS game

Government and organizations
 Main-d'œuvre immigrée, a French trade union grouping in the first half of the 20th century
 Minister of Information or Information minister, a governmental position
 Ministry of Information (disambiguation), government ministries of various countries
 Ministry of Interior, a governmental ministry for internal affairs

Science and technology
 Mars orbit insertion, modifying the trajectory of an interplanetary spacecraft to enter a Martian orbit
 Mechanism of injury
 Moment of inertia, a quantification of the rotational inertia of an object
 Multiplicity of infection, the ratio of infectious agents to infection targets

Languages
 Moi language (Congo), a Bantu language
 Moi language (Papua), spoken in the Bird's Head peninsula in northwestern Papua, Indonesia
 Moi language (Maluku), spoken on Makian Island in North Maluku, Indonesia
 MOI, ISO 639-3 code for the Mboi language of Nigeria

Other uses
 Mōʻī, Hawaiian title 
 Moi culture, a culture in central and northern Vietnam, northern Laos and southern Yunnan
 Moi Avenue (Mombasa), a major road in Mombasa, Kenya
 Moi, or Pacific threadfin, a species of threadfin fish cultivated in Hawaii
 MOI (file format), the file extension for the index file accompanying the MOD video file format used on many camcorders

See also
 Moy (disambiguation)